Got Moose? Re-Constriction CD Sampler #2 is a various artists compilation album released in 1997 by Re-Constriction Records. The album's title was inspired by Re-Constriction Records photographer Moose. Sonic Boom gave the album a mixed review, calling it an excellent prelude to later label material but noted the contributions of Purr Machine, Hot Box and Sissy Bar as being detractors.

Track listing

Personnel
Adapted from the Got Moose? Re-Constriction CD Sampler #2 liner notes.

 Chase – executive-producer

Release history

References

External links 
 Got Moose? Re-Constriction CD Sampler #2 at Discogs (list of releases)

1997 compilation albums
Electro-industrial compilation albums
Re-Constriction Records compilation albums